Alan Kenneth Armitage (born 25 January 1930) is an English former first-class cricketer.  Armitage was a right-handed batsman who occasionally fielded as a wicket-keeper.  He was born at Nottingham, Nottinghamshire.

Armitage made his first-class debut for Nottinghamshire against Warwickshire in the 1950 County Championship.  He played a further match that season against Hampshire.  In 1951, he made a single first-class appearance for his home county against Oxford University, where incidentally he himself was also studying.  In that same season he made two first-class appearances for the university, against the Free Foresters and Leicestershire.  In the match against the Free Foresters he scored his only first-class century, making 155 runs in the university's first-innings, while in their second-innings he followed this up with an unbeaten 57.  Two appearances in July in the 1951 County Championship against Somerset and Yorkshire were to be his final first-class appearances.  Playing against Yorkshire, he was part of a Fred Trueman hat-trick, with the then future England Test cricketer taking the wickets of Reg Simpson, Armitage and Peter Harvey.  Overall, Armitage scored 348 runs in first-class cricket, which came at an average of 34.80.

References

External links
Alan Armitage at ESPNcricinfo
Alan Armitage at CricketArchive

1930 births
Living people
Cricketers from Nottingham
English cricketers
Nottinghamshire cricketers
Alumni of Wadham College, Oxford
Oxford University cricketers